Linda Efler (born 23 January 1995) is a German badminton player who became the member of the national team in 2013. She affiliate with SC Union 08 Lüdinghausen, and won the National Championships women's doubles title in 2019 and 2020, also in the mixed doubles in 2019.

Achievements

European Championships 
Women's doubles

BWF World Tour (2 runners-up) 
The BWF World Tour, which was announced on 19 March 2017 and implemented in 2018, is a series of elite badminton tournaments sanctioned by the Badminton World Federation (BWF). The BWF World Tours are divided into levels of World Tour Finals, Super 1000, Super 750, Super 500, Super 300 (part of the HSBC World Tour), and the BWF Tour Super 100.

Women's doubles

Mixed doubles

BWF International Challenge/Series (4 titles) 
Women's doubles

Mixed doubles

  BWF International Challenge tournament
  BWF International Series tournament
  BWF Future Series tournament

References

External links 
 

1995 births
Living people
People from Emsdetten
Sportspeople from Münster (region)
German female badminton players